Strada statale 336 dell'Aeroporto della Malpensa (SS 336) is a State highway that connects the Milan-Varese motorway with the Turin-Trieste motorway, skirting the Milan Malpensa Airport.

Junctions

References 

336
Transport in Lombardy